Palazzo San Gervasio is a small agricultural town and comune in the province of Potenza, in the Southern Italian region of Basilicata.    It is bounded by the comuni (Municipalities) of Acerenza, Banzi, Forenza, Genzano di Lucania, Maschito, Spinazzola, and Venosa.

While the regional Lucanian dialect is still spoken amongst the older inhabitants, it has largely been replaced because the younger generations have been taught the standard form of Italian in school.

The town was allegedly founded in the early Middle Ages, after the nearby town of Banzi was destroyed by a Saracen attack.

References

External links
Il dialetto Lucano - The dialect of the Lucania

Cities and towns in Basilicata